ProBush.com was created by Michael and Benjamin Marino, brothers from the U.S. state of Pennsylvania.  Amidst heightened tension in the years following September 11th, the two brothers felt compelled to create a webpage which offered unconditional support of the 43rd US President, George W. Bush.

ProBush.com listed many celebrities and public personalities as "traitors" on its infamous "Traitor List".  This led to a multimillion-dollar lawsuit in 2003 which lasted several years, and included former US Senator James Abourezk, Roxanne Dunbar-Ortiz, and Jane Fonda. Todd Epp of South Dakota was said to be the driving force behind the hotbed issue of free speech that had been created.

Others included on the list were Susan Sarandon, Nancy Pelosi, Madonna, and Ray Wirth.

The lawsuit lasted several years and ultimately ended in an undisclosed settlement.

As of May 6, 2022, the website redirects to probiden.com, which sells shirts with messages supporting incumbent US president Joe Biden, including one telling former US president Donald Trump "You're Fired!"

Further reading
Digital Law Media Project: Abourezk v. ProBush.com
Article: Website Lists 142 Traitors
Article: First Amendment Threatened
Article: Abourezk Sues Over ‘Traitor’ List
Article: Web site won’t oppose adding Jane Fonda to ‘traitor list’ lawsuit
Article: Settlement reached in Abourezk ‘traitor list’ lawsuit

References

External links 

American political websites
George W. Bush
Internet properties established in 2001